Jakša Račić (5 August 1868 – 23 August 1943) was the Mayor of Split between February 1929 and June 1933. An ethnic Croat in modern terms, he was a supporter of King Alexander I's unitarianist policies, and considered himself a Yugoslav and a Dalmatian. He was a medical doctor by profession and one of the few non-Serbian members of the Chetnik movement.

Račić was born on 5 August 1868 in Vrbanj (part of Stari Grad) on the island of Hvar in the Kingdom of Dalmatia and studied in Prague, Graz and Innsbruck, where he attained a doctorate in 1900. He was employed in Innsbruck as an assistant at the Institute for General and Experimental Pathology, undertook further training in Ljubljana and became Director of his own surgical sanatorium in Split in 1904, the Račić Sanatorium. He oversaw the start of hospital modernization in the city, and began the forestation of Marjan hill.

World War II and assassination 

At the beginning of World War II Račić was appointed by Draža Mihailović as Chetnik Povjerenik ("trustee") for Dalmatia. Račić worked closely with Chetnik military commander Ilija Trifunović-Birčanin. Račić was executed for treason by the Partisans when, after the Italian capitulation in 1943, they temporarily liberated Split from Italian occupation.

References

1868 births
1943 deaths
People from Stari Grad, Croatia
People from the Kingdom of Dalmatia
Yugoslav National Party politicians
Chetniks
Mayors of Split, Croatia
Croatian people of World War II
World War II political leaders
Physicians from Split, Croatia
Charles University alumni
University of Graz alumni
University of Innsbruck alumni
University of Ljubljana alumni
Executed politicians
Executed Croatian people
People executed by Yugoslavia